Ambitions is an American drama television series created by Jamey Giddens and Will Packer, and executive produced by Will Packer Productions and Lionsgate Television. The series stars Robin Givens as the glamorous and powerful Stephanie Carlisle, the wife of Atlanta Mayor Evan Lancaster (Brian J. White) and Essence Atkins as Amara Hughes, a lawyer in the U.S. Attorney's Office, who recently relocated to Atlanta. The series premiered on June 18, 2019 on the Oprah Winfrey Network. The second half of the first season debuted on OWN, November 12, 2019. In January 2020, OWN canceled the series after one season.

Premise
Ambitions explores the sexy, deceitful machinations of love, power and politics in America's hottest urban mecca, Atlanta, Georgia. The action revolves around two intense rivalries. The first has formidable legal eagles Stephanie Carlisle (Robin Givens) and Amara Hughes (Essence Atkins), former best friends from Spelman College, as adversaries in both their personal and professional lives. At the story's inception, Amara and her husband, Titus Hughes (Kendrick Cross), move to Atlanta for a fresh start. Stephanie, who is married to Evan Lancaster (Brian J. White), the city mayor, is driven to ruin Amara's marriage over an old conflict over who would become Titus's long-term love interest. The second is between two powerful families—the Carlisles (who own a major law firm) and the Purifoys (who own a large pharmaceutical corporation). The series features themes such as infidelity, blackmail, stalking, murder, gentrification, racism, intra-racial class stratification and the American opioid crisis, which ground the show in contemporary issues. Unforgettable strivers like Mayor Lancaster's sister and round-the-way diner owner Rondell Lancaster (Brely Evans) and his mistress Mexican-American fashion designer Bella Tru (Erica Page) round out the ensemble cast of regulars.

Cast and characters

Main
Robin Givens as Stephanie Carlisle Lancaster, an ambitious attorney and the wife of Atlanta Mayor Evan Lancaster
Essence Atkins as Amara Hughes, Assistant United States Attorney and former friend-turned-adversary of Stephanie Lancaster 
Brian J. White as Evan Lancaster, Jr., Stephanie's husband and the ambitious Mayor of Atlanta, Georgia
Kendrick Cross as Titus Hughes, Amara's husband
Brely Evans as Rondell Pauline Lancaster, Evan Lancaster's older sister and owner of Thelma's Place 
Erica Page as Bella Tru, a fashion designer. She is one of Evan's lovers and mother of his illegitimate son.

Recurring
Christina Kirkman as Lori Purifoy, smart and challenging daughter of Hunter Purifoy who works in PR 
Steven Williams as Stephen Carlisle, a powerful attorney and father of Stephanie
Brian Bosworth as Hunter Purifoy, a savvy pharmaceutical magnate, who is in the throes of combating a class action lawsuit brought by the powerful Carlisle law firm family  
Deena Dill as Juniper Purifoy, Hunter's wife
Gino Anthony Pesi as Greg Peters, an aggressive, self-confident real estate developer who's trying to make Rondell sell him the family restaurant so he could use the block in an upcoming development plan 
Alexander Mulzac as Damian Collins
Kayla Smith as Carly Lancaster, Stephanie and Evan's smart and determined daughter, who's a theatre major at Spelman College 
Donna Biscoe as Irene Perkins-Carlisle, Stephanie's mother
Tony Vaughn as Evan "Senior" Lancaster, Sr., Evan and Rondell's father who founded Thelma's Place
Lana Young as Inez Trujillo, Bella's mother who works at Thelma's Place
Brianne Cordaro as Daphne Manning, a member of Evan Lancaster's city administration and his mistress 
Andrew Rush as Alix, Evan Lancaster's personal security detail
Felisha Terrell as Marylin Barnes, Stephanie and Amara's sorority sister, a philanthropist
E. Roger Mitchell as Marvin Barnes, Marilyn's husband and owner of Beta New Electric
Maria Legarda as Perla, Bella's jealous friend

Episodes

Production

Development
On April 17, 2018, it was announced that Oprah Winfrey Network ordered straight-to-series new scripted drama Ambitions from producer Will Packer and Lionsgate Television. The series was created by Jamey Giddens. Kevin Arkadie later joined as showrunner and Benny Boom directed the pilot episode. On January 23, 2020, the series was canceled after one season.

Casting
On November 13, 2018, it was announced that Givens will play the leading role, along with Atkins, White, Cross, Evans and Page. On December 4, 2018, Steven Williams and Christina Kirkman have joined the cast. In January 2019, Brian Bosworth, Deena Dill, Gino Anthony Pesi and Kayla Smith were cast in recurring roles for the first season.

References

External links
Official website

2019 American television series debuts
2019 American television series endings
American television soap operas
English-language television shows
Oprah Winfrey Network original programming
Serial drama television series
Television series by Lionsgate Television
Television shows filmed in Georgia (U.S. state)
Television shows set in Atlanta
Will Packer Productions television shows